The combat sport of wrestling has been practiced in Canada for more than a century with the first amateur wrestling championships being held at Toronto's Argonaut Rowing Club in 1901. The sport grew and by 1969 the Canadian Amateur Wrestling Association was formed. Today the same organization is called Wrestling Canada Lutte, and is the national governing body for Olympic style wrestling in Canada. The organization's purpose is to encourage and develop the widest participation and highest proficiency in Olympic wrestling in Canada.

Wrestling is a sport officially included in the Canada Summer Games program. Initially the program considered wrestling a winter sport and was featured at the first Canada Games in 1967. In 2005, women's amateur wrestling was added to the program.

Wrestling will be a part of the 2022 Canada Summer Games,  'Niagara Games', August 6-21, 2022, which will be hosted in the Niagara Region of Ontario, Canada. The  wrestling events will take place at the new Canada Games Park. 

A 45 minute television documentary was released in 2012 about women's wrestling in Canada called, Wrestling with Attitude highlighting two amateur female Canadian wrestlers.

Notables in Canadian wrestling 

Glynn Arthur Leyshon was a Canadian wrestler and university professor who played a significant role in the development of wrestling in Canada.

Carol Huynh won a bronze medal in the women's -48 kg category at the 2012 Summer Olympics.

Mikael Cruz won two national titles and a bronze medal in the men's -77 kg category at the 2007 World Championships.

Tonya Verbeek won a silver medal in the -55 kg freestyle competition at the 2012 Summer Olympics.

Danielle Suzanne Lappage is a Canadian wrestler who competed for Canada at the 2014 Commonwealth Games in Glasgow where she won a gold medal in the 63 kg freestyle. She also competed at the 2014 World Wrestling Championships where she finished in 5th place.

Canada Summer Games 

The following Canadian wrestlers have competed in the Canada Summer Games:

 Chris Rinke   (1979)
 Sunny Dhinsa  (2009)
 Justina Di Stasio  (2009)
 Linda Morais  (2009)
 Michelle Fazzari  (2005)
 David Tremblay  (2005)
 Darthe Capellan  (2013)

Gallery

Popular culture 

In 2012 a 45 minute TV movie/documentary was released by Vanwestfilm Productions about the development women's wrestling in Canada called, Wrestling with Attitude. The film focused on two Canadian wrestlers in particular: former Simon Fraser University wrestler Carol Huynh, who begins training with the Calgary Dinos at the University of Calgary, and Junior World Wrestling Champion, Danielle Lappage, originally from Alberta and was then training at Simon Fraser University in her first year as a Senior wrestler.

References

External links
Wrestling Canada Lutte (official website)

Video
Trailer for Wrestling with Attitude, a 2012 documentary about the development women's wrestling in Canada. (VanWestFilm Productions on YouTube)